Battle of Antrea was a Finnish Civil War battle, fought in Antrea (now Kamennogorsk, Russia) and Jääski (now Lesogorsky, Russia), Finland in 11 February – 25 April 1918 between the Finnish Whites against the Finnish Reds.

It was fought by the Vyborg–Joensuu railroad between Vyborg, the Red capital in Eastern Finland, and Antrea, an important railroad junction 30 kilometres north of Vyborg. The Reds targeted Antrea, but were stuck between the railway stations of Kavantsaari and Hannila and the nearby villages of Ahvola and Pullila. The most fierce battles were fought in Ahvola which was a highway crossing few kilometres west of the railroad. For the last nine weeks the warfare was mostly trench warfare. Therefore, the battles in Ahvola were called as the ″Verdun of Finland″, after the famous 1916 Battle of Verdun, although its size is not anything compared with the one of World War I. The battle ended in late April, as the Whites attacked Vyborg from further east and the Reds pulled back to defend the city.

Units

Whites 
The White Army in Antrea Front included the paramilitary White Guards, the Jäger troops and the Karelian Army. It was first commanded by colonel lieutenant Herman Wärnhjelm who was replaced in 12 February by captain Aarne Sihvo and Woldemar Hägglund as his staff officer.

Reds 
The Red units were composed of the Red Guards from Vyborg area and further from the Uusimaa region of Southern Finland from Helsinki, Vantaa, Hyvinkää and Mäntsälä. Helsinki Red Guard included the famous Jyry Company, which was an elite squad composed of the members of the working-class athletes club Jyry Helsinki. Also a unit of the Women's Red Guard took part at the battle. The Russian volunteer brigades came from Saint Petersburg, Moscow and Siberia. They all left the Antrea Front in late February as the armistice between Soviet Russia and the German Empire was broken and the troops were needed elsewhere. A group of Baltic Fleet sailors were still fighting later in March in Ahvola.

The Reds were commanded from by the Red Guards general staff in Vyborg, but they also had a local base in Kavantsaari. The commander-in-chief in Kavantsaari was the little-known factory worker A. Backman. Even his accurate identity is not clear, but Backman was presumably captured and then killed by the Whites in early May.

The battles

White retreat from Vyborg 

Three days before the start of the War, the Whites attempted to take Vyborg under their control but failed. The 300-men unit fled the town and headed south across the ice of Vyborg Bay to the small island of Venäjänsaari. 26 January the Whites decided to head north of Vyborg to Antrea and meet their main forces. The squad was now led by Adolf Aminoff, a 62-year-old retired colonel of the Russian Imperial Army. It crossed the Saint Petersburg railway in the village of Kämärä, where they had a clash with the Red Guards. The Battle of Kämärä is considered to be the first battle of the Finnish Civil War. After beating the Reds by the Kämärä station, the Whites ambushed a Red train on its way from Saint Petersburg to Finland. The so-called ″Great Gun Train″ was carrying a large cargo of rifles, artillery pieces and ammunition. It was escorted by a squad of 400 members of the Saint Petersburg Finnish Red Guard commanded by brothers Jukka and Eino Rahja. The train stopped by the station and was surprised by the Whites. After the Reds got their machine guns into shooting positions, the Whites fled Kämärä and continued their journey towards Antrea. The battles in Kämärä ended up with 18 killed Whites and up to 30 killed Reds. The Whites finally reached Antrea in 28 January. The local White Guards had taken the railway stations of Kavatsaari and Hannila a day earlier.

The early stage 
As the war started in 27 January, the Vyborg Reds advanced towards Antrea along the Vyborg-Joensuu railway. In 1 February they took the railway station in Tali, 10 kilometres north of Vyborg, and the next day the Karisalmi station 5 kilometres further north. In 9 February the Reds took the Kavantsaari railway station after a minor battle with the Whites. A day later the Reds lost it, but the next day they got reinforcements and took the station back again. 11 February the Reds also attacked the station of Hannila, but failed. Instead, they took the villages of Seistola and Ahvola located few kilometres west of the railroad. Ahvola was an important highway crossing of the Vyborg–Imatra and the Vyborg–Antrea highways.

In 12 February, the White commander Herman Wärnhjelm ordered his men to retreat from Hannila across the Vuoksi river but the captain Aarne Sihvo refused to follow the order. Instead, Sihvo ordered his men to attack Ahvola, which the Whites then took. They also made a failed attack against Kavantsaari. Wärnhjelm was now dismissed and replaced by Sihvo. The Reds in turn, lost a large number of their strength in the following days as the Russian volunteer brigades left the Antrea Front. Some minor attacks was still made, but after 24 February the front line was formed and the battle turned into a trench warfare. The two sides now had approximately 1,500 men in Ahvola and few hundred more in their other positions.

Ahvola and Pullila 

Since the late February, the battle concentrated to the village of Ahvola, about five kilometres west of the railway. The Reds attacked against the White lines daily at 9 AM and then pulled back to their own trenches as the Sun set. During this nine-week period, both sides lost approximately 20 men dead or wounded each day. The village of Pullila, five kilometres east of the railway, was held by the Reds. The Whites unsuccessfully attacked the village a couple of times.

Battles along the railway 
The five-kilometre part of the railway between Kavantsaari and Hannila was controlled by armoured trains so there was little infantry activity. The Reds had a Russian armoured train Ukrainsky Revolutsiya which the Bolsheviks had previously used in Ukraine. The other Red armoured train was Panssarijuna No. 4 (Armoured Train No. 4), made in the Fredriksberg Works in Helsinki. The Whites had an armoured train called Karjalan pelastaja (The Saviour of Karelia). It was nicknamed after the first battles in Hannila, where the train managed to hit the Reds back. The train itself was ″home made″, the Whites had armoured open wagons with bricks and planks and equipped it with a mountain gun and machine guns. The trains made some attacks against each other but usually without heavy losses. The major incident was in 23 March as the Ukrainsky Revolutsiya entered just 250 metres from the White lines and bombed the Hannila station for 20 minutes. The Whites managed to hit the train with a grenade but the Ukrainsky Revolutsiya was able to pull back with some help of Panssarijuna No. 4 and was then sent to Saint Petersburg for repairs.

The White Offensive 
In 23 April, the Whites launched their decisive offensive against Vyborg with 15,000 men. The Antrea Whites now encircled the railway 30 kilometres east via the village of Heinjoki and then closed Vyborg from the east along the Saint Petersburg railway. The Reds were ordered to leave their positions and pull back to Vyborg in 24–25 April and the Whites reserves left in Antrea were now able to take Kavantsaari and Pullila without any fighting. After the Battle of Vyborg in 24–29 April, the Civil War in Karelia was over.

Aviation

Whites 
Two German imported DFW C.V reconnaissance planes were flown to Antrea in late March under the command of the Danish lieutenant Knud von Clauson-Kaas. The planes were not used in action as the Swedish pilots refused to fly in demanding conditions. On 10–11 April, six Russian pilots defected Soviet Russia and joined the Finnish Whites with a Grigorovich M-9 flying boat, two Nieuport 10 reconnaissance planes and two Nieuport 17 fighters. The pilots were supporters of the Russian White movement. From 13 April, the Russian pilots made reconnaissance flights, bombed the Red positions and dropped propaganda leaflets. The planes operated from the Antrea Airfield in the ice of lake Päähkjärvi. This is considered to be the beginning of the Finnish Air Force.

Reds 
The Reds had two Russian Nieuport flying boats which were flown by three Russian pilots. They operated from the ice of the Pantsarlahti Bay in Vyborg. The planes made at least four reconnaissance and bombing flights between late February and the end of March.

Culture 
The Finnish composer Leevi Madetoja lost his brother during the Battle of Antrea as Yrjö Madetoja (b. 1885) was presumably captured and killed by the Reds in Kavantsaari 9 April. Madetoja composed a three-movement piano suite, The Garden of Death, Op. 41, for the memory of his lost brother.

References 

Conflicts in 1918
Antrea
Antrea
1918 in Finland
February 1918 events
March 1918 events
April 1918 events